Xabea is a genus of crickets in the subfamily Oecanthinae and tribe Xabeini.  Species can be found in Southeast Asia and Australia.

Description
The original paper states that the male has: "Body smooth, shining, very slender. Head fusiform, much elongated, rather shorter than the prothorax and broader than the fore part of the latter. Eyes elongated, rather small, slightly prominent. Palpi slender, filiform; third joint much longer than the second. Antenna; very slender. Prothorax very long, attenuated in front, slightly gibbous near its hind border; sides straight. Cerci less than half the length of the abdomen.  Legs very slender, very minutely pubescent; hind femora not inciassated; hind tibiae unarmed; tarsi three-jointed; second joint extremely short; third nearly half the length of the first; claws very small. Fine wings very broad, extending much beyond the abdomen, not reticulated; tympanum very large. Hind wings extending much beyond the fore wings."

Species 
Xabea includes the following species:
Xabea atalaia Otte & Alexander, 1983
Xabea decora Walker, 1869 - type species
Xabea elderra Otte & Alexander, 1983
Xabea furcata Chopard, 1927
Xabea inermis Chopard, 1930
Xabea latipennis Chopard, 1969
Xabea leai Chopard, 1951
Xabea levissima Gorochov, 1992
Xabea maculata Chopard, 1930
Xabea podoscirtoides Chopard, 1951
Xabea recticercis Chopard, 1969
Xabea tumbarumba Otte & Alexander, 1983
Xabea wyebo Otte & Alexander, 1983
Xabea zonata Chopard, 1969

References

External links
 

Ensifera genera
crickets
Orthoptera of Asia